Elliott Thomas Frear (born 11 September 1990) is an English professional footballer, who plays for National League South side Bath City, as a winger.

Career
Frear signed for Exeter City at the age of 11 and progressed through the club's Centre of Excellence sides, but after three seasons he was released from the club's youth system. Having spent two seasons playing local club football Frear was invited to a trial with Exeter in partnership with Exeter College and was offered a two-year placement on the College Football Academy programme. Following Frear's impressive 2008–09 season for the youth team scoring 15 goals from the left side of midfield Frear was offered a professional contract in March 2009.

In October 2009, Frear was sent out on loan to Southern League Premier Division side Tiverton Town initially on a month's loan later extended until the end of the season.

Frear made his professional début for Exeter in the FA Cup against Walsall as an 83rd-minute substitute for Daniel Nardiello in a 1–1 draw. The following week Frear made his Football League début against Yeovil Town playing the final 26 minutes in a 2–2 draw. On 23 November 2011, Frear scored his first professional goal in an FA Cup replay against Walsall having come on as a second-half substitute. Frear made his first professional start the following weekend against Tranmere Rovers in a 3–0 victory.
Frear signed a new contract with Exeter City in May 2012.
In late October 2012 he joined Conference South side Salisbury City on a one-month loan deal and made an immediate impact. He linked up well with the team and in late November it was announced he would remain at Salisbury for another month.

On 18 May 2013, Frear was released by Exeter City after he was not offered a new contract. He later signed at Salisbury City on a permanent basis.

On 25 June 2014, he joined Forest Green Rovers on a two-year deal. He made his debut for the club on 9 August 2014 in a 1–0 away win over Southport. He scored his first goal in a 2–2 away draw against Macclesfield Town on 4 October 2014. On 18 November 2014, he played the full 90 minutes for England C in an International Challenge Trophy fixture against the Estonia under 23s squad.

On 7 February 2015, he scored his second goal for Forest Green in a 2–1 home win over Grimsby Town. He helped the club to the Conference National play-offs for the first time in May 2015, although he couldn't prevent Bristol Rovers from earning a semi-final win.

On 7 November 2015, he scored Forest Green's winning goal in a stoppage time giant killing 2–1 win over Football League Two side AFC Wimbledon. He was then a part of the Forest Green side that made it through to the National League 2015–16 play-off final at Wembley Stadium on 15 May 2016, which ended in a 3–1 defeat against Grimsby Town.

On 26 January 2017, Frear signed for Scottish Premiership club Motherwell on a -year contract. He made his debut for Motherwell on 28 January 2017, as a substitute, against Rangers. He left the club in July 2019, having turned down the offer of a new contract.

On 18 October 2019, Frear signed for Forest Green Rovers for a second time, agreeing a short-term contract until January 2020.

On 27 August 2020, Frear signed a one-year deal with Scottish club Heart of Midlothian. 

On 23 July 2021, Frear returned to England to join National League South side Bath City.

Career statistics

References

External links

1990 births
Living people
Sportspeople from Exeter
Footballers from Devon
English footballers
Association football wingers
England semi-pro international footballers
Exeter City F.C. players
Tiverton Town F.C. players
Salisbury City F.C. players
Forest Green Rovers F.C. players
Motherwell F.C. players
Heart of Midlothian F.C. players
Bath City F.C. players
English Football League players
National League (English football) players
Southern Football League players
Scottish Professional Football League players